Remixed is a remix album by Canadian R&B singer Deborah Cox. It was released by J Records on July 22, 2003.

Track listing

Notes
 denotes additional producer

Charts

References

2003 remix albums
Deborah Cox albums
J Records albums